Đurović (also transliterated Djurovic) is a Serbian patronymic surname derived from a masculine given name Đuro. It may refer to:

 Borislav Đurović (1952–2003), Montenegrin football player
 Dragan Đurović (born 1959), Montenegrin politician
 Jelena Đurović (born 1973), Montenegrin journalist and political activist
 Nemanja Đurović (born 1986), Serbian-Bosnian football player
 Nenad Đurović (born 1986), Montenegrin football player
 Žarko Đurović (born 1961), Serbian football manager

See also
 Đurić, surname
 Đurđević (disambiguation), surname
 Đurovski, surname

Serbian surnames
Patronymic surnames